Pon Vilaintha Kalathur  is a village 10 km south of Chengalpattu in the Chengalpattu district in the state of Tamil Nadu, India. The village is located 10 km west of Tirukalukundram.

Religion
There are at least five temples in the village.

Education
P.P.Government High School, PV Kalathur, Chengalpattu, Tamil Nadu

Transportation
The nearest railway station is Ottivakkam, within walking distance of Pon Vilaintha Kalathur.

References 

Villages in Chengalpattu district